Rudolf Lehmann (11 December 1890 – 26 July 1955) was a German jurist and military judge who was the Judge Advocate General of the Wehrmacht in World War II. Lehmann was found guilty of war crimes at the High Command Trial at Nuremberg in 1948. He had close ties with Nazi Germany, but was not a member of the Nazi Party.

Career
His father was a professor of law. He grew up in Breslau and Hanau, studied law in Munich, Freiburg, Leipzig and Marburg and qualified as a lawyer before service as a reserve officer in the Imperial Army in World War I, during which he was awarded the Iron Cross. After the war he returned to Marburg University where he was awarded a doctorate in jurisprudence. He then entered government service as a prosecutor and worked at the Reich Justice Ministry.

He entered the Army Legal Service in October 1937 and from July 1938 to May 1945 was head of the Legal Department. In this role he assessed the charges against Generaloberst Werner von Fritsch between February and March 1938 and his judgement was for an acquittal. On 1 May 1944 he was given the unique rank of Generaloberststabsrichter (Colonel General Judicial Officer) which was equivalent to Generaloberst but outside the normal chain of command. He was taken into captivity in May 1945 and held in a US Army Prisoner of War Camp.

Nuremberg trials
He was found guilty of war crimes at the Nuremberg High Command Trial in October 1947 for involvement in drafting the Barbarossa decree and the Commissar Order that stipulated that any captured Soviet political commissar was to be executed, contrary to international law. He was sentenced to seven years imprisonment but was released from Landsberg Prison on 16 August 1950. He then lived in Bad Godesberg, where he was Managing Director of the mining trade association. He died in Bonn aged 64.

References

External links
 

1890 births
1955 deaths
Lawyers from Poznan
German Army generals of World War II
Colonel generals of the German Army (Wehrmacht)
Judges in the Nazi Party
German Army personnel of World War I
German prisoners of war in World War II held by the United States
People convicted by the United States Nuremberg Military Tribunals
German people convicted of war crimes
German people convicted of crimes against humanity